The Last of Mrs. Cheyney is a 1961 comedy film directed by  and starring Lilli Palmer, Carlos Thompson and Martin Held. The film was made as a co-production between France, Switzerland and West Germany. It is based on the 1925 play of the same title by the British writer Frederick Lonsdale which has been adapted into films on several occasions.

The film's sets were designed by the art directors Wolf Englert and Bruno Monden. It premiered at the Gloria-Palast in Berlin.

Cast

References

Bibliography 
 Bock, Hans-Michael & Bergfelder, Tim. The Concise CineGraph. Encyclopedia of German Cinema. Berghahn Books, 2009.

External links 
 

1961 films
1961 comedy films
German comedy films
Swiss comedy films
French comedy films
West German films
1960s German-language films
Films directed by Franz Josef Wild
German films based on plays
1960s German films
1960s French films